The National Folk Festival may refer to:

National Folk Festival (Australia), in Canberra, Australia
National Folk Festival (UK), several folk festivals in the United Kingdom
National Folk Festival (United States), touring national folk festival in the United States